Rhyparochromus vulgaris is a species of dirt-colored seed bug in the family Rhyparochromidae. It is found in Africa, Europe and Northern Asia (excluding China), North America, and Southern Asia. This bug was first recorded in North America in 2001.

Rhyparochromus vulgaris is sometimes considered a member of the genus Raglius, Raglius vulgaris.

References

External links

 

Rhyparochromidae
Articles created by Qbugbot
Insects described in 1829